Karyshkino (Käreşkä) is a rural locality (a village) in Tatlybayevsky Selsoviet, Baymaksky District, Bashkortostan, Russia. The population was 418 as of 2010. There are 5 streets.

Geography 
Karyshkino is located 41 km southeast of Baymak (the district's administrative centre) by road. Abdrakhmanovo is the nearest rural locality.

References 

Rural localities in Baymaksky District